NGP may refer to:
 Nagpur, City in Maharashtra India.
 Cessna NGP, next generation propeller aircraft
 National General Pictures, a distribution and film production company
 Natural growth promoter, feed additives for farm animals
 Naval Air Station Corpus Christi
 Neo Geo Pocket, a handheld video game system produced by SNK
 Neighbouring group participation, a chemistry principle
 Nevada Geothermal Power Inc., a renewable energy developer
 Next Generation Portable, codename of the handheld game console PlayStation Vita